Little Indian is an unincorporated community in Cass County, Illinois, United States. Little Indian is located near Illinois Route 78, south of Virginia.

References

Unincorporated communities in Cass County, Illinois
Unincorporated communities in Illinois